DeBary station is a train station in DeBary, Florida. It is the current northern terminus of Phase 1 of SunRail, the commuter train serving Central Florida. The station opened May 1, 2014, and marks the return of passenger rail service to the DeBary area, which previously operated from Benson Junction further to the north. The station is currently the northern terminus of SunRail until Phase 2 North is completed in the future.

DeBary is typical of most SunRail stations featuring canopies consisting of white aluminum poles supporting sloped green roofs and includes ticket vending machines, ticket validators, emergency call boxes, drinking fountains, and separate platforms designed for passengers in wheelchairs. The station is located along the former CSX A-Line (originally constructed by the Jacksonville, Tampa and Key West Railway) along the west side of US 17/92 just north of the Lake Monroe drawbridge. Due to ridership of over 10,000 on the first two days of service, the parking facilities quickly filled up leading Volusia County to start two free shuttle services, one from nearby Gemini Springs Park and another from Deltona Plaza at 1200 Deltona Blvd, Deltona. The free shuttles ended on May 16, 2014, coinciding with the end of free Sunrail service. Regular Votran bus routes 30, 31, 32, and 33 will continue to serve the DeBary station. A transit-oriented development called Integra 289 Exchange, which will feature a four-story, 289-unit luxury apartment community, is currently planned to be built adjacent to the station.

References

External links 

DeBary SunRail Station (Official Site)

SunRail stations
Railway stations in the United States opened in 2014
DeBary, Florida
Transportation buildings and structures in Volusia County, Florida
2014 establishments in Florida